Handball (also four square, n-square - where n is the number of players -, downball or king pin) is a ball game played in schoolyards in Australia, New Zealand, Fiji, South Africa, China and South East Asia. Unlike most types of handball, it does not incorporate a wall, instead of being played on a court consisting of lines on the ground. The game is most frequently played at recess, lunchtime, or before and after school. It can also be played at home or anywhere that has a hard surface and at least one line. The quick set-up time, simple rules and only requiring a tennis ball contributes to the game's popularity.

A typical handball court is a square or rectangle split into four or six smaller squares marked by painted lines, chalk, or the expansion joints made by laid concrete surfaces. The squares are usually named with some combination of Ace, King, Queen, Jack and Dunce, with "High" or a number like One or Two added to differential squares in games with more than 4 squares, such as "High King" or "Dunce One" & "Dunce Two" for the elimination squares in a 6 person court.

Due to the social nature of handball, the simplicity and ability to fit into wildly different locations, variations in rules are common. Students in one school might play in a square of four, while in the next school the game might involve a straight line of six squares, or any other number depending on the space available, altering the game. In addition, some variations of the game allow for the head, chest, knees or feet to be used to return the ball on the full alongside normal handball rules. This variation was common in Canberra high schools, such as Belconnen High School (with rules the same as hack slap) through the 1980's. 
While the rules may vary between schools, or even by individual friend groups, the basic rule is that players hit the ball with their hand in their square, into another square for another player to do the same until one player makes a mistake. Additional players will wait in a line to the side, with rules governing eliminations to enable players to rotate in and out of the game, commonly one elimination position in 4 square games & two elimination positions in 6 square games.
As skill levels vary and it is essentially a social game played in the complex social settings of primary and high schools, in some settings a degree of etiquette is expected, using gentler plays against weaker players, and harsher plays against skilled or arrogant players. 

The most commonly used ball in Handball is the hi-bounce ball. Popular brands such as VERAO and Spalding are often used.  In the 1970's and 1980's these were not widely available and standard tennis balls were most commonly used.

Rules

Basic rules 
 A game must have at least two players.
 The person in the leading square 'serves' the ball, bouncing it once within their square before it can enter an opponents square.
 Once the serve is complete, the receiver must hit the ball to another player.
 The ball must be hit so that it bounces in the player's own square on the first bounce, and into another player's square on the second bounce.
 If an outside object interferes with the play, the point will be replayed, known as a 'replay'
 When a player is 'out', they must proceed to the lowest square, or to the end of the line of players waiting to enter the court. Players on the court who were in a lower position each move up a square. On 4 square courts there is one relegation square, with 6 or more squares there will usually be two. With two elimination squares it becomes possible for a player who just moved up from the first square to be eliminated and sent back to the line by the player they just pushed down to the first square.
 Full/Straight/Lob: when the ball lands in another player's square on the first bounce, the player has 'lobbed' or has hit a 'foul'. If a player does not catch the ball and continues to play, they have 'played the lob/foul' also known as a 'full play' and are therefore out.
 Out: when the ball lands outside of the court, the last person who touched the ball or the last court the ball touched is out.
 Double Bounce/Dubs/Doubles: when the ball bounces twice in a person's square, the person who is in that square is out. Usually known as 'double', 'double bounce'.
 If the first bounce lands on a line and is not a 'full' or a 'double', it is known as 'lines'. When 'lines' is called the point is replayed.
 Double Touch: when the ball is touched twice in a row by the same person. This typically results in the elimination of the person who touched the ball twice in standard variations of handball.
 Grabs/Carry: when the ball is held or scooped instead of a clean hit, resulting in the elimination or demotion of the person who grabbed.
 Interference: if a player interferes with another player, they are usually out, or when a non-player interferes with gameplay, usually by walking across the court.
 Rolls/Dead Ball: if the player hits the ball in such a manner that it rolls along the ground, without bouncing, "rolls/dead ball" is allowed to be called and the ball is picked up and re-served.
 Rebound: in some schools, the ball can be rebounded off an outside object or a wall and is allowed one bounce back in the players square.

The court 
Even though each part of the court is referred to as "squares", they can be any shape or size. Edges or 'lines' can be marked with any material: paint, expansion joints, cracks, chalk, or points where the square meets an object such as a wall or locker. Commonly, the court has either a bitumen or concrete surface. Depending on the school, the squares will either be labelled Ace, King, Queen and Dunce or King, Queen, Jack and Dunce.

In popular culture 
Handball has entered the meme culture. In March 2013, former Australian Prime Minister Kevin Rudd released a video of him playing handball at Brisbane State High School, which led to him becoming part of a "handball meme". In late November 2017, Rudd played handball with students in a school in Brisbane, and the accompanying video - claiming he was the "king of handball" - reached 40,000 views on Facebook.

Handball is the main theme of the children's television series, Handball Heroes, which aired on ABC Me (Then ABC 3) in 2013, as well as Hardball which aired on ABC Me in 2019.

References

External links
 Handball Australia

Sport in New Zealand
Wall and ball games
Sport in Australia
Sport in Fiji
Sports originating in Australia